SNARC may refer to:

 Spatial-numerical association of response codes
 Stochastic neural analog reinforcement calculator, an early neural network implementation
 South Notts Amateur Radio Club
Smallest Named and Registered Clade